Neferuptah or Ptahneferu (“Beauty of Ptah”) was a daughter of the Egyptian king Amenemhat III (c. 1860 BC to 1814 BC) of the 12th Dynasty. Her sister was the Pharaoh Sobekneferu (“Beauty of Sobek”).

Biography 

Neferuptah is one of the first royal women whose name was written inside a cartouche. Although she never had the title 'king's wife', she must have had a special status; it is possible she was regarded as a future ruler.

Her titles included member of the elite, great of favour, great of praise and beloved king's daughter of his body.

A burial for her was prepared in the tomb of her father at Hawara. However, she was not buried there, but in a small pyramid at Hawara. Her tomb was found intact in 1956 and still contained her jewellery, a granite sarcophagus, three silver vases and other objects.

The granite sarcophagus was inscribed with a short offering formula. Inside the sarcophagus were found the decayed remains of two wooden coffins. The outer one was decorated with inscribed gold foil. Identical inscriptions were found on the sarcophagus of Queen Hatshepsut, who lived about 300 years later. Her tomb is mentioned on a papyrus found at Lahun. She is depicted next to her father in the temple at Medinet Madi. Objects belonging to her include a sphinx of black granite and the fragment of a statue found on Elephantine.

References

Further reading

Princesses of the Twelfth Dynasty of Egypt
19th-century BC Egyptian women
Children of Amenemhat III